Hypsioma lyca is a species of beetle in the family Cerambycidae. It was described by Dillon and Dillon in 1945. It is known from Brazil, Colombia, Ecuador and Peru.

References

lyca
Beetles described in 1945